Nicholas Conn (born 28 December 1981) is a British businessman. He is the founder and CEO of a drug and alcohol rehab center called Help4addiction, which was founded in 2015.

Education and career 
Nicholas Conn graduated from Watford Grammar School for Boys.

At the age of 19, he started his career as a policeman in Metropolitan Police Service which lasted for five years.

Addiction and recovery
After five years Conn left the police force because of cocaine addiction. He then started working for real estate companies and left Britain to work in Berlin, where he encountered with Albanian mafia members.  In his book, he describes the whole experience as "life-threatening."

After leaving Berlin, he wrote the memoir The thin white line (2013). He is frequently found on news media informing about addiction and advocating recovery.

References

1981 births
Living people
21st-century English businesspeople
21st-century English memoirists
Metropolitan Police officers